Sylvester is the third studio album by Sylvester. Previously Sylvester had released two albums on the Blue Thumb Records credited to Sylvester and the Hot Band. It was his first disco album in the series of three that were recorded and released by Fantasy Records in the late 1970s. The album was issued with the alternative title Over and Over in France.

Two singles were issued from the album. The first single, a self-penned song called "Down, Down, Down", charted at #18 in the Billboard Dance chart.
The following single "Over and Over" written by Ashford & Simpson failed to make any impression on the charts. On the track "I've Been Down", the lead vocals are performed by Izora Rhodes and Martha Wash, known at the time as Two Tons o' Fun, they later went on to record as The Weather Girls.
The album was re-issued on compact disc in the UK by Southbound Records in 1995, together with the album Step II, this release features no bonus tracks.

Track listing

Side A
 "Over and Over" (Nickolas Ashford, Valerie Simpson) - 6:58
 "I Tried to Forget You" (Sylvester James, James "Tip" Wirrick) - 4:59
 "Changes" (James) - 3:07
 "Tipsong"  (James, Wirrick) - 3:59

Side B
 "Down, Down, Down" (James) - 5:18
 "Loving Grows Up Slow" (Morgan Ames) - 4:01
 "I Been Down" (Rob Galbraith, Maury Keener) - 3:39
 "Never Too Late" (James) - 2:57

Personnel
 Sylvester - lead vocals and backing vocals
 The Weather Girls (Izora Armstead, Martha Wash) - lead vocals and backing vocals
 James "Tip" Wirrick - electric guitar
 Dan Reich - synthesizers and  electric piano
 John Dunstan - bass
 Jack "Sandyjack" Reiner - drums
David Frazier - percussions
Leslie Drayton - string and horn arrangements

Production
Recorded, mixed and mastered at Fantasy Studios, Berkeley.
 Harvey Fuqua - producer
 Sylvester James - co-production
 Eddie Bill Harris - mixing engineer Tracks: 4, 5, 7 and 8
 Phil Kaffel - mixing engineer Tracks: 1, 2, 3 and 6
 Phil Bray - photographer
 Phil Carroll - art direction
 Jamie Putnam - design

Release history
LP:
 1977 Fantasy Records F-9531.

CD:
 1995 Southbound Records CDSEWD 104

References

1977 albums
Sylvester (singer) albums
Albums produced by Harvey Fuqua
Fantasy Records albums